A midfielder is a position in association football.

Midfielder may also refer to:

 Midfielder (Australian rules football), a centre or wingman in Australian rules football
 Midfielder (bandy), a position in bandy
 Midfielder (lacrosse), a position in lacrosse
 Midfielder (rugby union), a centre in rugby union
 A general sports term for a player who occupies a position in the midfield